Ruebin Natardy Walters (born 2 April 1995, in Diego Martin) is an athlete from  Trinidad and Tobago specialising in the high hurdles. He represented his country at the 2017 World Championships without reaching the semifinals.

International competitions

Personal bests

Outdoor
200 metres – 22.06 (+0.7 m/s, Mesa 2015)
400 metres – 49.27 (Port-of-Spain 2012)
110 metres hurdles – 13.30 (+1.8 m/s, Port-of-Spain 2017)
400 metres hurdles – 50.68 (Levelland 2016)

Indoor
200 metres – 21.76 (Tucson 2016)
400 metres – 49.59 (Albuquerque 2015)
60 metres hurdles – 7.72 (Nashville 2017)

References

1995 births
Living people
Trinidad and Tobago male hurdlers
World Athletics Championships athletes for Trinidad and Tobago
Alabama Crimson Tide men's track and field athletes
Central American and Caribbean Games silver medalists for Trinidad and Tobago
Competitors at the 2018 Central American and Caribbean Games
Athletes (track and field) at the 2019 Pan American Games
Pan American Games competitors for Trinidad and Tobago
Central American and Caribbean Games medalists in athletics